Samin may refer to the following notable subjects:

Places
Samin, Warmian-Masurian Voivodeship, Polish village in the Warmian-Masurian Voivodeship province
Samin, Kuyavian-Pomeranian Voivodeship, Polish village in the Kuyavian-Pomeranian Voivodeship province

People
Samin (name)
Samin people

See also
Samim (Samim Winiger), a Swiss producer of electronic dance music